The Supreme Political Council (SPC;  al-Majlis as-Siyāsiyy al-ʾAʿlā) is a largely unrecognised executive body formed by the Houthi movement and the General People's Congress (GPC) to rule Yemen. Formed on 28 July 2016, the presidential council consists of nine members and was headed by Saleh Ali al-Sammad as president until his death from a drone air strike on 19 April 2018 with Qassem Labozah as vice-president. The territory that it rules consists of the former North Yemen, which united with South Yemen in 1990.

The SPC carries out the functions of head of state in Yemen and is to manage Yemen's state affairs in a bid to fill in political vacuum during Yemeni Civil War in 2015. The Council aims to outline a basis for running the country and managing state affairs on the basis of the existing constitution. Later, the SPC was also responsible for forming a new government led by Abdel-Aziz bin Habtour known as the National Salvation Government.

The members were sworn in on 14 August 2016. On 15 August, the Supreme Revolutionary Committee (SRC) handed power to the Supreme Political Council. However, the SPC is only recognized by a few states and remains internationally largely unrecognized.

Background

In the wake of president Abdrabbuh Mansur Hadi and prime minister Khaled Bahah resignations over Houthi rebels takeover of presidential palace in January 2015, Houthi leader Abdul Malik Al Houthi reportedly proposed a six-member "transitional presidential council" which would have equal representation from north and south, although this proposal was rejected by the Southern Movement. Nevertheless, on 1 February, the Houthis gave an ultimatum to Yemen's political factions warning that if they did not reach a solution to the current political crisis, then the Houthi "revolutionary leadership" would assume formal authority over the state. According to Reuters, political factions have agreed to form an interim presidential council to manage the country for up to one year. Former South Yemen president Ali Nasser Mohammed was originally being considered as a prospective interim leader, but Mohammed later declined the post.

On 6 February 2015, the Houthis formally assumed over authority in Sanaa, declaring the dissolution of House of Representatives and announced that a "presidential council" would be formed to lead Yemen for two years, while a "revolutionary committee" would be put in charge of forming a new, 551-member national council. This governance plan was later affirmed by Houthi Ansarullah politburo leader Saleh Ali al-Sammad as he said that national council would choose a five-member presidential council to govern the country.

Current members
The Ministry of Foreign Affairs lists the following members of the SPC:

National Salvation Government
On 2 October 2016, Abdel-Aziz bin Habtour was appointed as Prime Minister by the Houthis. On 4 October, he formed his cabinet. The cabinet is composed of members of the Southern Movement. However, the cabinet is not internationally recognized.

On 28 November 2016, a new cabinet was formed. It is only composed by members of pro-Saleh GPC and the Ansarullah Movement.

However, the UN Special Envoy for Yemen Ismail Ould Cheikh Ahmed said the move was "a new and unnecessary obstacle. Yemen is at a critical juncture. The actions recently taken by Ansarullah and the General People's Congress will only complicate the search for a peaceful solution. The parties must hold Yemen’s national interests above narrow partisan ambitions and take immediate steps to end political divisions and address the country’s security, humanitarian and economic challenges." He further claimed that such an action could harm peace talks.

On 27 October 2020, the Minister of Youth and Sport Hassan Mohammed Zaid was shot dead by unknown gunmen in the capital Sanaa.

Diplomatic relations with other states 
The National Salvation government has diplomatic relations with only a few countries, in particular Iran, and Syria. Additionally, the government has diplomatic contacts with Abkhazia, North Korea and Russia. In 2015, the Wall Street Journal reported that the government would seek contacts with China, Iran and Russia. In 2016, a National Salvation government official had invited several North Korean diplomats to Damascus. The same year, a delegation of the National Salvation government visited Russia and met the Russian Deputy Minister of Foreign Affairs. In 2017, foreign minister Hisham Sharaf Abdullah met with the chargés d’affaires of the Russian and the Syrian Embassy in Sanaa. In August 2019, the National Salvation government appointed an Ambassador to Tehran. In early 2020, the Saba News Agency reported that Hisham Sharaf Abdullah called China a "friendly government". In October 2020, Iran appointed an Ambassador to Sanaa. Two months later, the United States sanctioned the Iranian Ambassador to Sanaa. In August 2020, the National Salvation government appointed an Ambassador to Damascus. In March 2021, the National Salvation government appointed Ambassador in Damascus met with the Abkhaz Ambassador to Syria.

The President, the Parliament Speaker and the Foreign Minister of the National Salvation government have sent numerous diplomatic notes to a wide range of countries, like Algeria, Bahamas,
Comoros, Kiribati, Malawi, Malta, Mongolia, Montenegro, Slovenia, South Sudan and Venezuela.

References

Houthis
Politics of Yemen
Yemeni Crisis (2011–present)
Axis of Resistance